is a former Japanese volleyball player.

She also played for Japan National women's volleyball team and participated at the 2006 World Championship. Her nickname is Japanese High Tower (ジャパニーズハイタワー).

Profile
Birthplace:　Ube, Yamaguchi
Height: 188 cm 6ft 2in tall

National team
2002: 13th place in the 2002 World Championship
2003: 5th place in the World Cup in Japan
2006: 6th place in the 2006 World Championship

External links
 FIVB biography
JT Marvelous

1979 births
Living people
People from Yamaguchi Prefecture
Asian Games medalists in volleyball
Volleyball players at the 2002 Asian Games
Volleyball players at the 2006 Asian Games
Japanese women's volleyball players
Asian Games silver medalists for Japan
Medalists at the 2006 Asian Games